This is a list of the native woody plant species of Lithuania. The most common trees, shrubs, subshrubs, and liana species are marked with a star (*). The list contains 98 woody and semi-woody plant species.

Trees

Conifers 
()
 European Larch
 Norway Spruce (Picea abies; Paprastoji eglė)*
 Scots Pine (Pinus sylvestris; Paprastoji pušis)*
 English Yew (Taxus baccata; Europinis kukmedis)

Flowering plant 
()
 Norway Maple (Acer platanoides; Paprastasis klevas)
 Common Alder (Alnus glutinosa; Juodalksnis)*
 Grey Alder (Alnus incana; Baltalksnis)*
 Silver Birch (Betula pendula; Karpotasis beržas or Beržas svyruoklis)*
 Downy Birch (Betula pubescens; Plaukuotasis beržas)*
 Common Hornbeam (Carpinus betulus; Paprastasis skroblas)
 Common Beech (Fagus sylvatica; Paprastasis bukas)
 Common Ash (Fraxinus excelsior; Paprastasis uosis)
 European Crab Apple (Malus sylvestris; Miškinė obelis)
 Black Poplar (Populus nigra; Juodoji tuopa)
 Common Aspen (Populus tremula; Drebulė or Epušė)*
 European Wild Pear (Pyrus pyraster; Miškinė kriaušė)
 Sessile Oak (Quercus petraea; Bekotis ąžuolas)
 English Oak (Quercus robur; Paprastasis ąžuolas)
 White Willow (Salix alba; Baltasis gluosnis)
 Crack Willow (Salix fragilis; Trapusis gluosnis)
 European Rowan (Sorbus aucuparia; Paprastasis šermukšnis)
 Small-Leaved Lime (Tilia cordata; Mažalapė liepa)
 Wych Elm (Ulmus glabra; Kalninė guoba)
 European White Elm (Ulmus laevis; Paprastoji vinkšna)
 Field Elm (Ulmus minor; Paprastasis skirpstas)

 Small trees or large shrubs 

 Conifers 
()
 Common Juniper (or Ėglius)*

 Flowering plant 
()
 Common Hazel (Corylus avellana; Paprastasis lazdynas)
 Crataegus laevigata (Crataegus laevigata; Grauželinė gudobelė)
 Common Hawthorn (Crataegus monogyna; Vienapiestė gudobelė)
 Crataegus rhipidophylla (Crataegus rhipidophylla; Miškinė gudobelė)
 Common Spindle (Euonymus europaeus; Europinis ožekšnis)
 Alder Buckthorn (Frangula alnus; Paprastasis šaltekšnis)
 Sour Cherry (Prunus cerasus; Paprastoji vyšnia)
 Bird Cherry or Hackberry (Prunus padus; Paprastoji ieva)
 Blackthorn or Sloe (Prunus spinosa; Dygioji slyva)
 Common Buckthorn (Rhamnus cathartica; Dygioji šunobelė)
 Long-Leaved Violet Willow (Salix acutifolia; Smailialapis gluosnis)
 Goat Willow (Salix caprea; Blindė)*
 Grey Willow (Salix cinerea; Pilkasis karklas sin. Pilkasis gluosnis)
 Violet Willow (Salix daphnoides; Pajūrinis gluosnis)
 Salix gmelinii (Salix gmelinii; Ilgalapis gluosnis)
 Salix myrsinifolia (Salix myrsinifolia; Juosvasis karklas)
 Bay Willow (Salix pentandra; Virbinis gluosnis)*
 Almond Willow or Almond-Leaved Willow (Salix triandra; Krantinis gluosnis)*
 Common Osier (Salix viminalis; Žilvitinis karklas)*

 Shrubs 

 Flowering plant 
()
 Jaundice Berry or European barberry, Ambarbaris
 Betula humilis (Betula humilis; Liekninis beržas)
 Dwarf Birch (Betula nana; Beržas keružis)
 Common Dogwood (Cornus sanguinea; Raudonoji sedula)
 Crataegus rhipidophylla (Crataegus rhipidophylla; Šlaitinė gudobelė)
 Mezereon (Daphne mezereum; Paprastasis žalčialunkis)
 Euonymus verrucosus (Euonymus verrucosus; Karpotasis ožekšnis)
 Fly Honeysuckle or European Fly Honeysuckle, Dwarf Honeysuckle, Fly Woodbine (Lonicera xylosteum; Paprastasis sausmedis)
 Bog Myrtle or Sweet Gale (Myrica gale; Pajūrinis sotvaras)
 Alpine Currant (Ribes alpinum; Kalninis serbentas)
 Blackcurrant (Ribes nigrum; Juodasis serbentas)*
 Nordic Redcurrant or Nordic Currant, Downy Currant (Ribes spicatum; Ilgakekis serbentas)
 Rosa caesia (Rosa caesia; Kietalapis erškėtis)
 Dog Rose (Rosa canina; Paprastasis erškėtis)*
 Glaucous Dog Rose (Rosa dumalis; Melsvalapis erškėtis)
 Cinnamon Rose (Rosa majalis; Miškinis erškėtis)
 Soft Downy Rose (Rosa mollis; Švelnialapis erškėtis)
 Sweet Briar or Eglantine Rose (Rosa rubiginosa; Rūdėtasis erškėtis)
 Eared Willow (Salix aurita; Ausytasis karklas)
 Downy Willow (Salix lapponum; Laplandinis karklas)
 Swamp Willow (Salix myrtilloides; Mėlynlapis karklas)
 Purple Willow (Salix purpurea; Purpurinis karklas)
 Creeping Willow (Salix repens; Gulsčiasis karklas)
 Rosemary-Leaved Willow (Salix rosmarinifolia; Pelkinis karklas)
 Salix starkeana (Salix starkeana; Žemasis karklas)
 Guelder Rose or Water Elder (Viburnum opulus; Paprastasis putinas)

 Small shrubs 

 Flowering plant 
()
 Bog Rosemary
 Kinnikinnick (Arctostaphylos uva-ursi; Miltinė meškauogė sin. arkliauoge, kiauluoge)
 Common Heather or Ling, Heather (Calluna vulgaris; Šilinis viržis)*
 Chamaedaphne calyculata (Chamaedaphne calyculata; Durpyninis bereinis)
 Black Crowberry (Empetrum nigrum; Juodoji varnauogė)
 Cross-Leaved Heath (Erica tetralix; Tyrulinė erika)
 Wild Rosemary or Marsh Labrador Tea (Ledum palustre; Pelkinis gailis)
 Small Cranberry (Vaccinium microcarpum; Smulkiauogė spanguolė)
 Common Bilberry or Blue Whortleberry (Vaccinium myrtillus; Mėlynė)*
 Bog cranberry or Swamp cranberry (Vaccinium oxycoccos; Paprastoji spanguolė)
 Bog Bilberry or Northern Bilberry (Vaccinium uliginosum; Vaivoras)
 Lingonberry or Cowberry (Vaccinium vitis-idaea; Bruknė)*

 Subshrubs 

 Flowering plant 
 Arctic raspberry
 Rubus aureolus (Rubus aureolus; Krūmininė gervuogė)
 European Dewberry (Rubus caesius; Paprastoji gervuogė)*
 Knoutberry (Rubus chamaemorus; Paprastoji tekšė)
 Common Blackberry (Rubus fruticosus; Raukšlėtoji gervuogė)
 Red Raspberry or European Raspberry (Rubus idaeus; Paprastoji avietė)*
 Rubus nessensis (Rubus nessensis; Stačioji gervuogė)
 Stone Bramble (Rubus saxatilis; Paprastoji katuogė)
 Rubus scissus (Rubus scissus; Septynlapė gervuogė)
 Rubus wahlbergii (Rubus wahlbergii; Lazdynlapė gervuogė)
 Bittersweet (Solanum dulcamara; Karklavijas)
 Lemon Thyme (Thymus pulegioides; Keturbriaunis čiobrelis)
 Breckland Thyme (Thymus serpyllum; Paprastasis čiobrelis)
 Common Mistletoe or European Mistletoe (Viscum album; Paprastasis amalas or Laumės šluota'')

Liana

Flowering plant 
 English Ivy or Common Ivy

See also

References

External links 
 theplantlist.org / The Plant List provides the Accepted Latin name for most species
 efloras.org / Botanical Glossary Online
 conifers.org / Web's premier source of information on conifers and their allies
 kew.org / Royal Botanic Gardens, Kew
 botanika.lt / State Research Institute of Botany
 botanikos-sodas.vu.lt / Vilnius University Botanical Garden

Lithuania
Flora of Lithuania
Lithuania
Trees
Trees
Forests